Yasin Osman Kenadid (1919–27 November 1988) was a Somali intellectual, writer and linguist. He was an influential literary scholar, having written a seminal dictionary of the Somali language.

Family and name
Yasin was a member of the Kenadid family. He is related to Ali Yusuf Kenadid, the second Sultan of the Sultanate of Hobyo. His father, Osman Yusuf Kenadid, was the brother of Ali Yusuf and the creator of the Osmanya script.

Biography
Kenadid was born in Hobyo (Obbia), Somalia during 1919. He attended a Quranic school until he was fifteen. He then move to Mogadishu, attending both Italian and Arabic schools where he learned English.

Kenadid helped found the Society for Somali Language and Literature. He is also one of the thirteen founders of the Somali Youth League (SYL) and was member of the National Somali Language Committee that decided on the standard spelling of modern Somali.

Works
Kenadid's best-known book is the dictionary that was the only standard Somali dictionary for decades:
Qaamuuska Af-Soomaaliga, 1976 Mogadishu/Firenze, Wasaradda Hiddaha iyo Taclinta Sare,
Akademyaha Dhaqanqa.

He is also known as an influential literary scholar:
1984 Ina Abdille Hassan and his literary activity, Naples, Istituto Universitario Orientale

References

1919 births
1988 deaths
Ethnic Somali people
Somalian lexicographers
Somalian scholars
Somalian writers
20th-century lexicographers